Phyllurus pinnaclensis, also known as the Pinnacles leaf-tailed gecko, is a species of geckos found in Queensland in Australia.

References

Phyllurus
Endemic fauna of Australia
Geckos of Australia
Reptiles described in 2019